Hobart Cavanaugh (September 22, 1886 – April 26, 1950) was an American character actor in films and on stage.

Biography
He was born in Virginia City, Nevada on September 22, 1886. Cavanaugh attended the University of California.

He worked in vaudeville, teaming with Walter Catlett at some point. He appeared in numerous Broadway productions, including the original 1919 musical Irene and the long-running 1948 musical As the Girls Go.

He made his film debut in San Francisco Nights (1928).  Over the next few years he established himself as a supporting actor, and although many of his roles were small and received no film credit, he played more substantial roles in films such as I Cover the Waterfront (1933) and Mary Stevens, M.D. (1933). By the mid-1930s, he was appearing in more prestigious productions, such as A Midsummer Night's Dream (1935), Captain Blood (1935), Wife vs. Secretary (1936) and A Letter to Three Wives (1949). He continued playing small, often comical roles until the end of his life, mostly as downtrodden or henpecked men. By the end of his life, he had appeared in more than 180 films.

Cavanaugh suffered from late-stage stomach cancer while filming Stella (1950). He could not eat and collapsed twice on the set but was determined to see his final performance through. He died following an operation at the Motion Picture & Television Country House and Hospital in Woodland Hills, California.

Partial filmography

 San Francisco Nights (1928) as Tommie
 State Fair (1933) as Professor Fred Coin – Hog Judge (uncredited)
 Lilly Turner (1933) as Earle (scenes deleted)
 A Study in Scarlet (1933) as Thompson – Innkeeper (uncredited)
 I Cover the Waterfront (1933) as One Punch McCoy
 Gold Diggers of 1933 (1933) as Dog Salesman (uncredited)
 Private Detective 62 (1933) as Harcourt S. Burns
 The Mayor of Hell (1933) as Mr. Gorman
 Mary Stevens, M.D. (1933) as Alf Simmons
 Headline Shooter (1933) as Happy
 No Marriage Ties (1933) as Smith
 The Devil's Mate (1933) as Parkhurst
 Goodbye Again (1933) as Mr. Clayton
 Bureau of Missing Persons (1933) as Mr. Harris (uncredited)
 Too Much Harmony (1933) as Piano Tuner (uncredited)
 Footlight Parade (1933) as Title-Thinker-Upper (uncredited)
 My Woman (1933) as Mr. Miller
 Broadway Through a Keyhole (1933) as Peanuts Dinwiddie
 From Headquarters (1933) as Muggs Manton
 Havana Widows (1933) as Mr. Otis
 Convention City (1933) as Wendell Orchard
 Death Watch (1933)
 Moulin Rouge (1934) as Drunk
 Easy to Love (1934) as Hotel Desk Clerk
 Hi, Nellie! (1934) as Fullerton
 Dark Hazard (1934) as George Mayhew
 I've Got Your Number (1934) as Happy Dooley
 Mandalay (1934) as Purser (uncredited)
 Fashion Follies of 1934 (1934) as Inventor on Ship (uncredited)
 Wonder Bar (1934) as Drunk (uncredited)
 Jimmy the Gent (1934) as Fake Worthingham
 A Modern Hero (1934) as Henry Mueller
 Harold Teen (1934) as Pop
 A Very Honorable Guy (1934) as Benny
 Merry Wives of Reno (1934) as Derwent
 The Key (1934, aka High Peril) as Homer, Tennant's Aide
 Now I'll Tell (1934) as Freddie Stanton
 Madame du Barry (1934) as Professor de la Vauguyon
 Housewife (1934) as George
 Kansas City Princess (1934) as Alderman Sam Warren
 A Lost Lady (1934) as Robert
 I Sell Anything (1934) as Stooge
 The St. Louis Kid (1934) as Richardson
 The Firebird (1934) as Emile – Brandt's Valet
 I Am a Thief (1934) as Daudet
 Bordertown (1935) as Harry
 Wings in the Dark (1935) as Mac
 While the Patient Slept (1935) as Eustace
 Husband's Holiday (1935, Short) as Meek Husband
 Don't Bet on Blondes (1935) as Philbert O. Slemp
 Broadway Gondolier (1935) as Music Critic Gilmore
 We're in the Money (1935) as Max
 Page Miss Glory (1935) as Joe Bonner
 I Live for Love (1935) as Townsend
 A Midsummer Night's Dream (1935) as Philostrate – Master of Revels to Theseus
 Dr. Socrates (1935) as Stevens
 Captain Blood (1935) as Dr. Bronson
 Steamboat Round the Bend (1935)
 Two Against the World (1936) as Tippy Mantus
 The Lady Consents (1936) as Mr. Yardley
 Wife vs. Secretary (1936) as Joe
 Colleen (1936) as Noggin
 The Golden Arrow (1936) as DeWolfe
 Love Begins at Twenty (1936) as Jacob 'Jake' Buckley
 Stage Struck (1936) as Wayne
 Cain and Mabel (1936) as Milo
 Here Comes Carter (1936) as Mel Winter
 Love Letters of a Star (1936) as Chester Blodgett
 Three Smart Girls (1936) as Wilbur Lamb
 Sing Me a Love Song (1936) as Mr. Barton (uncredited)
 Mysterious Crossing (1936) as Ned J. Stebbins
 Hearts Divided (1936)
 The Mighty Treve (1937) as Mr. Davis
 Girl Overboard (1937) as Joseph L. 'Joe' Gray
 The Great O'Malley (1937) as Pinky Holden
 Night Key (1937) as Petty Louie
 Love in a Bungalow (1937) as Mr. Kester
 Reported Missing (1937) as 'Ab' Steele
 Carnival Queen (1937) as Profesor Silva
 That's My Story (1937) as Sheriff Otis
 A Girl with Ideas (1937)
 Cowboy from Brooklyn (1938) as Mr. 'Pops' Jordan
 Strange Faces (1938) as Expectant Father of 'Six' (uncredited)
 Orphans of the Street (1938) as William Grant
 Idiot's Delight (1939) as Frueheim (uncredited)
 The Adventures of Jane Arden (1939) as Suspect 'Killer'
 Broadway Serenade (1939) as Mr. Ingalls (scenes deleted)
 Never Say Die (1939) as Druggist (uncredited)
 Zenobia (1939) as Mr. Dover
 Rose of Washington Square (1939) as Whitey Boone
 Tell No Tales (1939) as Charlie Daggett
 Naughty but Nice (1939) as Clark's Piano Tuner (uncredited)
 Daughters Courageous (1939) as Tourist (uncredited)
 The House of Fear (1939) as Minor Role (uncredited)
 Career (1939) as Jim Bronson
 I Stole a Million (1939) as Jenkins' Bespectacled Asst. (uncredited)
 Chicken Wagon Family (1939) as Henri Fippany
 The Covered Trailer (1939) as E. L. Beamish
 That's Right – You're Wrong (1939) as Dwight Cook – a Screenwriter
 Reno (1939) as Abe Compass
 A Child is Born (1939) as Mr. West
 The Honeymoon's Over (1939) as Avery Butterfield
 Four Wives (1939) as Mr. Jenkins (uncredited)
 The Ghost Comes Home (1940) as Ambrose Bundy
 Shooting High (1940) as Clem Perkle
 An Angel from Texas (1940) as Mr. Robelink
 You Can't Fool Your Wife (1940) as Potts, GBG & P Vice President
 I Can't Give You Anything But Love, Baby (1940) as Justice of the Peace (uncredited)
 Love, Honor and Oh-Baby! (1940) as 'Gimpy' Darnell
 Stage to Chino (1940) as J. Horatio Boggs
 Hired Wife (1940) as William
 Public Deb No. 1 (1940) as Mr. Schlitz
 Street of Memories (1940) as Mr. Foster
 Charter Pilot (1940) as Horace Cavanaugh
 The Great Plane Robbery (1940) as Homer Pringle
 Santa Fe Trail (1940) as Barber Doyle
 Meet the Chump (1941) as Juniper
 I Wanted Wings (1941) as Mickey
 Horror Island (1941) as Professor Jasper Quinley
 Reaching for the Sun (1941) as Front Office Man
 Thieves Fall Out (1941) as David Tipton
 The Hard-Boiled Canary (1941) as Announcer (uncredited)
 Our Wife (1941) as Shipboard Passenger (uncredited)
 Down in San Diego (1941) as Telegraph Clerk (uncredited)
 Skylark (1941) as Small Man in Subway Car
 Playmates (1941) as Philip Tremble (uncredited)
 A Close Call for Ellery Queen (1942) as Mr. Crandall (uncredited)
 A Tragedy at Midnight (1942) as Charles Miller
 The Remarkable Andrew (1942) as Teller / Witness (uncredited)
 Land of the Open Range (1942) as Pinky Gardner
 My Favorite Spy (1942) as Jules
 Tarzan's New York Adventure (1942) as Hotel Desk Clerk (uncredited)
 Lady in a Jam (1942) as Reporter in Glasses (uncredited)
 Jackass Mail (1942) as Gospel Jones
 The Magnificent Dope (1942) as Albert Gowdy
 Her Cardboard Lover (1942) as Arresting Plainclothesman (uncredited)
 Pittsburgh (1942) as Derelict (uncredited)
 Whistling in Dixie (1942) as Mr. Panky
 Stand By for Action (1942) as Carpenter's Mate 'Chips'
 The Meanest Man in the World (1943) as Mr. Throckmorton (uncredited)
 The Human Comedy (1943) as Drunk at Bar (uncredited)
 Taxi, Mister (1943) as Police Fingerprint Man (uncredited)
 Pilot No. 5 (1943) as Boat Owner (uncredited)
 The Man from Down Under (1943) as Boots
 The Kansan (1943) as Josh Hudkins
 Dangerous Blondes (1943) as Edward E. 'Pop' Philpot
 Sweet Rosie O'Grady (1943) as Clark
 A Scream in the Dark (1943) as Leo Stark
 Gildersleeve on Broadway (1943) as Homer
 Jack London (1943) as Mike, Saloonkeeper
 What a Woman! (1943) as Mailman (uncredited)
 Louisiana Hayride (1944) as Malcolm Cartwright
 Kismet (1944) as Moolah
 San Diego I Love You (1944) as Mr. McGregor (uncredited)
 Guest in the House (1944) as Mr. Blossom (uncredited)
 Together Again (1944) as Perc Mather (uncredited)
 The Captain from Köpenick (1945, also known as I Was a Criminal) as Rosenkrantz, the Treasurer
 Roughly Speaking (1945) as The Teacher (uncredited)
 The House of Fear (1945) as Bit Part (uncredited)
 I'll Remember April (1945) as Joe Billings
 Don Juan Quilligan (1945) as Mr. Rostigaff
 Cinderella Jones (1946) as George
 The Spider Woman Strikes Back (1946) as Bill Stapleton
 The Hoodlum Saint (1946) as Antique Clock Dealer (uncredited)
 Our Hearts Were Growing Up (1946) as Mr. Dudley (uncredited)
 Night and Day (1946) as Man in Hospital Hall (uncredited)
 Black Angel (1946) as Jake
 Faithful in My Fashion (1946) as Mr. Wilson
 No Leave, No Love (1946) as Arthur Keenan Kalabush (uncredited)
 Margie (1946) as Mr. Angus MacDuff
 Little Iodine (1946) as Mr. Tremble
 Easy Come, Easy Go (1947) as Higgins – Repair Shop Manager (uncredited)
 Driftwood (1947) as Judge Beckett
 Doctor Jim (1947) as Mayor
 My Girl Tisa (1948) as Sigmund (uncredited)
 The Inside Story (1948) as Mason – bank customer
 Best Man Wins (1948) as Amos
 Up in Central Park (1948) as Mayor Oakley
 A Letter to Three Wives (1949) as Mr. Manleigh
 Stella (1950) as Tim Gross (final film role)

References

External links

 
 
 

1886 births
1950 deaths
20th-century American male actors
American male film actors
American male stage actors
Burials at Holy Cross Cemetery, Culver City
People from Carson City, Nevada
University of California, Berkeley alumni
Vaudeville performers